Tadeusz Sendzimir Steelworks is the second largest steel plant in Poland. It opened on July 22, 1954, in a newly built, easternmost district of Kraków called Nowa Huta. The steelworks as well as the district were located in the area formerly occupied by the village of Mogiła and surrounding farmland.

During the Communist rule, the plant was called Vladimir Lenin Steelworks. The name was changed in 1990, following the collapse of communism, and the factory was renamed to commemorate the scientist and engineer Tadeusz Sendzimir. In its heyday – in the 1970s – the plant employed around 40,000 people and annually produced almost 7 million tons of steel. In the 1980s, it was one of the most important centers of anticommunist resistance, with numerous strikes and street demonstrations taking place in Nowa Huta.

In January 2005, the plant was purchased by the Mittal Steel Company and now it is owned by Arcelor-Mittal, the largest steelmaker in the world. Its current name is ArcelorMittal Poland S.A. Oddział Kraków, but the name Tadeusz Sendzimir Steelworks is still commonly used.

External links 
ArcelorMittal webpage

Companies based in Kraków
Iron and steel mills in Poland
Manufacturing companies established in 1954
1954 establishments in Poland
Buildings and structures in Kraków
Industrial buildings completed in 1954